Daniel O'Connor may refer to:

Politics
Daniel O'Connor (politician) (1844–1914), Australian colonial politician and businessman
Danny O'Connor (Northern Irish politician) (born 1965), former Social Democratic and Labour Party representative in Northern Ireland
Danny O'Connor (Ohio politician) (born 1986), American Democratic congressional nominee

Sport
Daniel O'Connor (athlete) (born 1952), American Olympic athlete
Dan O'Connor (baseball) (1868–1942), Canadian Major League Baseball player
Dan O'Connor (American football) (1894–1964), professional American football player
Danny O'Connor (footballer) (born 1980), Irish footballer
Danny O'Connor (boxer) (born 1985), American boxer
Danny O'Connor (bowls) (?–2017), New Zealand lawn bowls player

Other uses
Dan O'Connor (prospector) (1864–1933), Canadian businessman and prospector
Dan O'Connor, lead singer and guitarist of the pop punk band Four Year Strong
Dan O'Connor (actor) (born 1978), Australian actor and singer
Danny O'Connor (born 1949), American recording artist; see Canary Conn
 Daniel O'Connor (bishop)
 Danny Boy O'Connor (born 1968), American rapper, art director, and executive director of The Outsiders House Museum

See also
 Daniel Connor (disambiguation)